Publius Cornelius Scipio may refer to:

 Publius Cornelius Scipio (consular tribune 395 BC)
 Publius Cornelius Scipio Asina (c. 260 BC–after 211 BC), consul in 221 BC
 Publius Cornelius Scipio (consul 218 BC) (d. 211 BC)
 Publius Cornelius Scipio Africanus
 Publius Cornelius Scipio (son of Scipio Africanus), a historian
 Publius Cornelius Scipio Nasica (consul 191 BC)
 Publius Cornelius Scipio Nasica Corculum
 Publius Cornelius Scipio (flamen Dialis)
 Publius Cornelius Scipio Africanus Aemilianus
 Publius Cornelius Scipio Nasica Serapio
 Publius Cornelius Scipio Nasica (consul 111 BC)
 Quintus Caecilius Metellus Pius Scipio, formerly Publius Cornelius Scipio Nasica
 Publius Cornelius Scipio (consul 16 BC)

See also
 Scipio Africanus (disambiguation)